Na Kae is a district (amphoe) in the province Nakhon Phanom in northeast Thailand.

Geography
Neighboring districts are (from the north clockwise): Wang Yang, Pla Pak, Renu Nakhon, and That Phanom of Nakhon Phanom Province; Dong Luang of Mukdahan province; and Tao Ngoi and Khok Si Suphan of Sakon Nakhon province.

History
The district dates back to Mueang Kabin (เมืองกบิล), which was deserted after it was invaded by an enemy army. It was later resettled by Lao people.

In 1917 the district's name was changed from Nong Sun (หนองสูง) to Na Kae. The name means 'field of Kae trees' (Combretum quadrangulare), which grew profusely in swampy areas.

Administration

Central administration 
Na Kae is divided into 12 sub-districts (tambons), which are further subdivided into 143 administrative villages (mubans).

Missing numbers are tambons which now form Wang Yang district.

Local administration 
There are two sub-district municipalities (thesaban tambons) in the district:
 Na Kae consisting of parts of sub-district Na Kae.
 Phra Song consisting of sub-district Phra Song.

There are 11 subdistrict administrative organizations (SAO) in the district:
 Na Kae consisting of parts of sub-district Na Kae.
 Nong Sang consisting of sub-district Nong Sang.
 Na Khu consisting of sub-district Na Khu.
 Phiman consisting of sub-district Phiman.
 Phum Kae consisting of sub-district Phum Kae.
 Kan Lueang consisting of sub-district Kan Lueang.
 Nong Bo consisting of sub-district Nong Bo.
 Na Liang consisting of sub-district Na Liang.
 Ban Kaeng consisting of sub-district Ban Kaeng.
 Kham Phi consisting of sub-district Kham Phi.
 Si Chomphu consisting of sub-district Si Chomphu.

Economy
Na Kae district is the site of a shuttered 72 million baht solid waste facility built in 2011 and abandoned in 2013. In Ban Phon Sawan, the facility occupies 70 rai. It was designed to serve four districts: Na Kae, That Phanom, Renu Nakhon, and Wang Yang. It suspended operations two years after its launch due to high costs. The facility was designed to separate organic waste from other materials to be turned into fertiliser for sale. Absent the facility, local authorities are struggling to cope with 20 tonnes of garbage per day. Based on an auditor's findings, the facility cannot operate as intended and cannot be fixed or amended for other uses. The auditor recommended that an investigation be carried out to identify those responsible for the problem and seek the return of 72 million baht.

References

External links
amphoe.com (Thai)

Na Kae